This article contains a list of many of the known works by Edward Robert Hughes, who was associated with the Pre-Raphaelite Brotherhood.

List

See also 
 List of Pre-Raphaelite paintings

References

External links
 A British Symbolist In Pre-Raphaelite Circles: Edward Robert Hughes RWS (1851-1914)
 

Edward Robert Hughes